Petrescu is a patronymic family name common in Romania, meaning "son of Petre". Notable people with this surname include:
Anca Petrescu, architect and politician
Arcadie Petrescu, neurologist
Barbu Petrescu, mayor of Bucharest (1989–1990)
Camil Petrescu, writer
Cezar Petrescu, writer
Constantin Titel Petrescu, social-democratic politician
Costin Petrescu, painter
Costin Petrescu, rock music drummer
Cristian Petrescu, politician
Dan Petrescu (disambiguation)
Daniela Petrescu, long-distance runner
Dimitrie Petrescu-Stelaru, writer
Dumitru Petrescu, communist politician
Emil Petrescu, mayor of Bucharest (1914–1916; 1918)
Emilia Petrescu, soprano
Ghenadie Petrescu, deposed Romanian Metropolitan Patriarch
Gică Petrescu, singer
Horia Petra-Petrescu, literary critic
Marian Petrescu (born 1970), Romanian jazz pianist
Nicolae Petrescu (1886–1954), philosopher and sociologist
Nicolae Petrescu-Comnen, diplomat and politician
Nicolae Petrescu Găină, painter
Teodosie Petrescu, Archbishop of Tomi
Virgil Petrescu, politician
Zaharia Petrescu, physician

It is also the maiden name of:
Elena Ceaușescu, communist politician and wife of Nicolae Ceaușescu
Rodica Mateescu, triple jumper

See also

Romanian-language surnames
Patronymic surnames
Surnames from given names